Dmitry Fyodorovich Stepushkin (3 September 1975 – 30 June 2022) was a Russian bobsledder who competed from 2000. He won three medals in the four-man event at the FIBT World Championships with two silvers (2005, 2008) and a bronze (2003).

Stepushkin also competed in three Winter Olympics, earning his best finish of ninth in the four-man event twice (2006, 2010 – tie).

Stepushkin died on 30 June 2022, at the age of 46.

References

External links
 
 Dmitry Stepushkin: NBC profile for the 2010 Winter Olympics
 
 Bobsleigh four-man world championship medalists since 1930

1975 births
2022 deaths
Russian male bobsledders
Olympic bobsledders of Russia
Bobsledders at the 2002 Winter Olympics
Bobsledders at the 2006 Winter Olympics
Bobsledders at the 2010 Winter Olympics
Sportspeople from Voronezh